Jerzy Koszutski (30 January 1905 – 15 June 1960) was a Polish cyclist. He competed in the sprint event at the 1928 Summer Olympics.

References

External links
 

1905 births
1960 deaths
People from Siedlce
People from Siedlce Governorate
Polish male cyclists
Olympic cyclists of Poland
Cyclists at the 1928 Summer Olympics
Sportspeople from Masovian Voivodeship